was a castle in the city of Hikone, Shiga Prefecture, Japan. 
This castle was an important military stronghold of Ōmi Province. The Azai clan held this castle in the Sengoku Period. Niwa Nagahide held it after the ruin of the Azai clan  and later, Ishida Mitsunari in the end of the 16th century.

This castle was attacked by Kobayakawa Hideaki after the Battle of Sekigahara. The castle surrendered at half a day though the brother of Mitsunari, Ishida Masazumi and his father Ishida Masatsugu , defended it.  Afterwards, Ii Naomasa occupied Sawayama Castle. However, he destroyed it, and moved to Hikone Castle. Much of Sawayama Castle's stone walls and buildings were carried away for use in Hikone Castle. At present, the only indication of this old history is a sign reading "The Site of Sawayama Castle."

There is also a hiking course that leads to the summit of Mount Sawayama, from which hikers see a panoramic view that includes Hikone Castle and Lake Biwa.

Notable people
 

Isono Tamba-no-kami, an officer of Azai Nagamasa

Gallery

Further reading

References

Castles in Shiga Prefecture
Azai clan